The route passes through the heart of Wales, and is also known by its Welsh name  (meaning: 'Wales' green lane').

Both ends are easily accessible via the rail network.

Route

Cardiff to Brecon
This largely follows the Taff Trail:

Cardiff | Pontypridd | Abercynon | Merthyr Tydfil | Brecon

Alternative: Chepstow to Glasbury
Lon Las Cymru provides an alternative south route for those coming into Wales from the Severn Bridge, following Route 42 from Chepstow to Glasbury, where it joins Route 8:

Chepstow | Usk | Abergavenny | Glasbury

There is also a small loop at the top of Route 42 providing links to Hay-on-Wye.

Brecon to Machynlleth
Brecon | Talgarth | Glasbury | Erwood | Builth Wells | Newbridge on Wye | Llanwrthwl | Rhayader | Llangurig | Llanidloes | Staylittle | Machynlleth

Machynlleth to Porthmadog
Machynlleth | Dolgellau | Trawsfynydd | Penrhyndeudraeth | Porthmadog

Porthmadog to Holyhead
Porthmadog | Penygroes | Caernarfon | Bangor | Holyhead

External links
 Sustrans map and description - north section
 Sustrans map and description - south section
 Wales Trails
 A map of the route

National Cycle Routes
Cycleways in Wales
Transport in Anglesey
Transport in Gwynedd
Cycleways in Powys
Transport in Merthyr Tydfil
Transport in Rhondda Cynon Taf
Transport in Cardiff
Transport in Monmouthshire
Elenydd
Brecon Beacons
Rail trails in Wales